Dr. Christine M. Riordan is the 10th president of Adelphi University in New York.

Career
From 1995 to 2005, at the Terry College of Business at the University of Georgia, Riordan was the founding and managing director of the Institute for Leadership Advancement.

As associate dean for external relations and the Luther Henderson University Chair of Strategic Management and Leadership at the Neeley School of Business at Texas Christian University from 2005 to 2008, Riordan was responsible for the functions of marketing, public relations, alumni relations, executive education and student leadership programs. Additionally, she served as the business school liaison to develop the university’s new interdisciplinary TCU Energy Institute. Riordan served as dean of the Daniels College of Business at the University of Denver (DU) from 2008 to 2013. From 2013 to 2015, Riordan was provost at the University of Kentucky, where she oversaw all academic operations.

Riordan has been president of Adelphi University since July 1, 2015 and the first woman to serve in the position. In Riordan’s first year she held a "100-Day Listening Tour", during which she met with students, faculty, and staff to learn about the University’s strengths and areas of potential growth. This became the foundation for a strategic plan, Momentum.

Riordan is currently serving on the following boards: Adelphi University, Commission for Independent Colleges and Universities in New York, Long Island Regional Council for Higher Education, RE/MAX Holdings, Inc, and Long Island Association.

Awards
 Long Island Press Power List of the 50 most influential people on Long Island (2016) (2017) (2018) 
Bethpage Best of Long Island Awards Best College President (2017)
Advancement for Commerce, Industry & Technology (ACIT) Monsignor Hartman Humanitarian Award (2017)
Premier Business Woman of Long Island (2019)

Research, writing, and consulting
Riordan’s research focuses on diversity and inclusion issues, leadership development and effectiveness, and career success. She has consulted with corporations on leadership-development activities, diversity and inclusion management, and team performance. Her written work has been distributed in the Harvard Business Review, Forbes, CNN, and Politico.

References

External links
 http://president.adelphi.edu/christine-riordan/

Living people
Adelphi University faculty
People from Lansing, Michigan
People from Georgia (U.S. state)
Georgia State University alumni
Georgia Tech alumni
Year of birth missing (living people)